Cladospongia is an extinct genus of sponges in the family Preperonidellidae from the Silurian period. The species C. alaskensis is from the Heceta Limestone Formation, on Prince of Wales Island, Southeastern Alaska.

References

External links 
 
 

Prehistoric sponge genera
Agelasida
Silurian animals
Silurian Alaska
Fossil taxa described in 2008